Gaius Domitius Dexter (fl. 2nd century) was a Roman senator who was appointed consul twice: firstly as suffect consul prior to AD 183, and secondly as ordinary consul in AD 196 with Lucius Valerius Messalla Thrasea Priscus as his colleague.

Biography
Domitius Dexter's origins are unknown. A member of the Senate, he was appointed consul suffectus sometime prior to AD 183, most probably during the last years of the reign of Marcus Aurelius. From 183 to 185, he was the Proconsular imperial legate (governor) of Syria Palaestina. It has been speculated that during this time he enjoyed a cordial relationship with the future emperor Septimius Severus, who was posted as the legatus legionis or commander of the Legio IV Scythica during his time as governor.

Domitius Dexter was a key supporter of Severus’ bid for the imperial title after the murder of Pertinax. In gratitude for his support, Severus appointed Domitius Dexter as praefectus urbi of Rome in June 193. He held the post during an extended period when Severus was absent from Rome, having gone to the east to deal with his rival Pescennius Niger, reflecting the emperor's trust in his subordinate. He was still in the office when he was elected consul prior alongside Lucius Valerius Messalla Thrasea Priscus in AD 196.

Sources
 Birley, Anthony, Septimius Severus: The African Emperor (1999)
 Mennen, Inge, Power and Status in the Roman Empire, AD 193-284 (2011)

References

2nd-century Romans
Imperial Roman consuls
Urban prefects of Rome
Year of birth unknown
Year of death unknown